The Melvin Beederman Series is a series of books written by Greg Trine and illustrated by Rhode Montijo. The series mainly talk about a new superhero guarding the city of Los Angeles. Los Angeles hasn't had a superhero since Kareem Abdul-Jabbar retired. That superhero's name is Melvin Beederman. In his adventures, Melvin has a sidekick named Candace Brinkwater who is a 3rd grader. Candace Brinkwater got her superpowers when Melvin's cape got switched with hers at the cleaners. Therefore, Candace got some of Melvin's powers. Candace and Melvin both share the same weakness of bologna. Notorious "Bad guys" try to stop Melvin and Candace from interfering with their criminal activities.

Characters 
Melvin, Candace, Carl, Headmaster Spinner, Hugo, and The Mcnastys.

Bad Guys

Grunge McNasty 
Grunge McNasty is the leader of the McNasty Crime Syndicate. He's the biggest and the smelliest and that's good enough for him. No prison can hold him for very long, not with his criminal mind—and stinky feet.

Filthy McNasty 
Filthy McNasty is number two man in the McNasty Crime Syndicate. His brother calls him number two for short. When he's not robbing banks with Grunge, he's thinking of sinister ways to do away with Melvin Beederman.

Mudball McNasty 
Mudball left school in third grade and has a habit to forget things. She was voted Most Likely to Become A Linebacker back in her days at Devious Dames High School. And she's been gaining  weight ever since. She can crack most safes simply by putting her shoulder into it while yelling, “sixty-four, twenty-two, hike!”. She hates taking orders from her sister Puke McNasty.

Puke McNasty 
Puke McNasty is the leader of the female side of the McNasty Crime Syndicate. Her focus?—jewels, of course. If it shimmers Puke goes after it. As the eldest McNasty sister, she's an expert at bossing Mudball around. After all, someone's got to do it. She likes giving orders to her sister and hates vegetables and superheroes.

Superhero Carl 
Superhero Carl is a superhero who also graduated in the Academy.  His cape was taken from him since Headmaster Spinner caught him making a website on Melvin's weaknesses.  He got revenge later in the fourth book, "Terror in Tights" but also failed in doing that.

External links
Official site

Series of children's books
American children's novels
Superhero novels